The Prince and the Maid is a 1924 German silent film directed by Ludwig Czerny and starring Ada Svedin, Charles Willy Kayser and Emil Stammer.

The film's sets were designed by the art director Fritz Willi Krohn.

Cast
 Ada Svedin as Pipsi, Tochter des Bürgermeisters
 Charles Willy Kayser as Carlo XVII., Fürst von Ponteredo / Octav d'Olbert
 Emil Stammer as Nicodemus Carnero, Bürgermeister von Pontecuculi
 Hermann Böttcher as Graf Dodo Caramba Formanoli, Hofmarschall
 Ellen Isenta as Innozencia Primarose, Schauspielerin
 Rudi Oehler as Bonaventura Baldrian, Komiker

References

Bibliography
 Alfred Krautz. International directory of cinematographers, set- and costume designers in film, Volume 4. Saur, 1984.

External links

1924 films
Films of the Weimar Republic
German silent feature films
Films directed by Ludwig Czerny
German black-and-white films
1920s German films